The Charlottetown Yacht Club (CYC) was founded in 1922 and is a public, registered, not-for-profit yacht club located in Charlottetown, Prince Edward Island, Canada.

External links
 Official CYC website
 Official Facebook page

Organizations based in Charlottetown
Yacht clubs in Canada
Non-profit organizations based in Prince Edward Island
1922 establishments in Canada